Natsume's Book of Friends is a Japanese anime television series based on the manga series by Yuki Midorikawa. The first anime series was produced by Brain's Base under the direction of Takahiro Omori. It was broadcast on the TV Tokyo network in two seasons of 13 episodes each, the first from July 7 to September 29, 2008 and the second, called , from January 5 to March 30, 2009. NIS America later released the series from Volume 1 through Volume 3 alongside Natsume's Book of Friends seasons 1 and 2 on February 4, 2014.

Both seasons were released on five DVDs each. 

The third season, titled  aired between July 5 to September 27, 2011.

The fourth season, titled  aired between January 2 to March 26, 2012.

The fifth season, titled  began airing on October 4, 2016.

The sixth season, titled  began airing on April 11, 2017.

Episode list

First season

Second season

Third season

Fourth season

Fifth season

Sixth season

OAD and OVA LaLa Specials

References 

Natsume Yujin-cho